The Silent Aircraft Initiative was a study undertaken by the Cambridge-MIT Institute to discover ways to reduce aircraft noise dramatically, to the point where it would be virtually unnoticeable to people outside the airport perimeter. Launched in November 2003, the program has the support of Rolls-Royce, Boeing and Marshall Aerospace.
Part of the study is examining if a steeper continuous descent into an airport will reduce approach noise levels. Theoretical analysis will be backed up by field trials using real jetliners.

A major part of the study is developing jetliner and engine designs that can meet the SAI objectives. The favoured configuration is a blended wing design, with the engines located on the upper surface of the wing, to shield ground observers from the engine noise. A very low specific thrust (i.e. very high bypass ratio) turbofan is proposed for the aircraft. Engine handling and low jet noise are facilitated by the use of a variable area final nozzle, to rematch the fan. Acoustic treatment in the intake and exhaust ducting minimizes turbomachinery noise. Because the blended wing is too shallow to accommodate twin engines, a four-engine configuration is proposed.

The study is funded by the UK Treasury and industrial partners.

See also
 SAI Quiet Supersonic Transport, a silent business jet

References

External links
The 'Silent' Aircraft Initiative website
aero-astro article

Aircraft noise reduction
International civil aircraft
Jet engine technology